Deepa is the third studio album by new jack swing group Troop released by Atlantic Records on June 2, 1992. The album includes the #1 R&B hit "Sweet November" written by Babyface. Also, It is the final album to feature all five members until six years later.

Deepa is largely a concept album, and includes somewhat racier subject matter than their previous two releases.

Reception

Track listing
 "Praise" - (Harreld, Steve Russell, Warren)
 "Keep You Next to Me" - (Lawrence McNeil, Demetrius Shipp) 	
 "She Blows My Mind" - (Steve Russell, Demetrius Shipp)
 "I'm Not Gamin'" - (Steve Russell, Demetrius Shipp)
 "Set Me Free" - (Gregory Cauthen, Steve Russell)
 "Strange Hotel" - (Lawrence McNeil)
 "I Feel You" - (Gregory Cauthen, Steve Russell)
 "Sweet November" - (Babyface)
 "Come Back to Your Home" - (Steve Russell)
 "Only When I Laugh" - (Gregory Cauthen, Steve Russell)
 "Whatever It Takes (To Make You Stay)" - (Drayton, Lawrence McNeil)
 "You Take My Heart With You" - (Steve Russell)
 "Deepa" - (Gregory Cauthen, Steve Russell)
 "Give It Up" - (Gregory Cauthen, Steve Russell)
 "Hot Water" - (Ray Lamont Jones, Lawrence McNeil)

Personnel
Troop - Lead and Backing Vocals
Steve Russell - Piano
Chuckii Booker - Keyboards
Gerald Albright - Saxophone
Gregory Cauthen - Percussion

Charts

Weekly charts

Year-end charts

Singles

External links
 Troop-Deepa at Discogs

References

1992 albums
Troop (band) albums
Atlantic Records albums